Serge Panine is a 1922 Austrian-French silent film directed by  Maurice de Marsan and Charles Maudru and starring  Albert von Kersten and Dora Kaiser. It is based on the novel of the same title by Georges Ohnet.

The film's sets were designed by Artur Berger.

Cast
 Albert von Kersten as Serge Panine  
 Willy Hendrichs 
 François de Kerdec 
 Gyula Szőreghy 
 Paul Askonas 
 Dora Kaiser as Jeanne de Cerny  
 Violette Jyl as Micheline  
 Suzanne Munte as Madame Desvarennes  
 Franz Kammauf

References

Bibliography
 Goble, Alan. The Complete Index to Literary Sources in Film. Walter de Gruyter, 1999.

External links

1922 films
Films directed by Maurice de Marsan
Films directed by Charles Maudru
French silent feature films
Austrian silent feature films
Films based on French novels
Films based on works by Georges Ohnet
French black-and-white films
Austrian black-and-white films
1920s French films